Halldóra Mogensen (born 11 July 1979) is an Icelandic politician from the Pirate Party who was elected to the Althing in 2016.

References 

1979 births
Living people
21st-century Icelandic politicians
21st-century Icelandic women politicians
Pirate Party (Iceland) politicians
Members of the Althing
Place of birth missing (living people)